A cymbal-banging monkey toy (better known as Jolly Chimp) is a mechanical depiction of a monkey holding a cymbal in each hand. When activated it repeatedly bangs its cymbals together and, in some cases, bobs its head, chatters, screeches, grins, and more. There are both traditional wind-up versions and updated battery-operated cymbal-banging monkeys. The cymbal-banging monkey toy is an example of singerie.

History
The Japanese company Daishin C.K. manufactured the classic Jolly Chimp during the 1950s to 1970s under the name "Musical Jolly Chimp". It screeched and showed its teeth when its head was pressed. It had a black on/off lever on its back and came with a green arm tag.

Later versions from other toy makers copied the facial expressions but often changed the toy's outfit and name. In the mid-1960s through the early 1970s, the Japanese-manufactured "Charley Chimp" was sold by street peddlers on the streets of lower Manhattan in NYC. Other brand names include "Wind-up Monkey Playing Cymbals" from Russ, "Pepi Tumbling Monkey with Cymbal" from Yano Man Toys, "Clockwork Musical Monkey with Clashing Cymbals", "Musical Monkey", "Magic Monkey","Mister Monkey"  and "Jolly Chimp". There is also one called "Charlie Chimp" from Lincoln, which is different from "Charley Chimp".

With many other companies manufacturing various versions in the United States, China, Hong Kong, Japan, Taiwan and the Philippines, the toy's appearance varies. The change in manufacturing countries was primarily due to factories going out of business and seeking the lowest manufacturing costs. This is still the case today. The monkey has been seen wearing red-and-white-striped pants and a yellow vest with red buttons, or red overalls and a stocking cap. Other outfits include green-striped pants, blue-striped pants, a red shirt with either green or blue pants, and plaid blue overalls. The monkeys are sometimes rendered with red rings painted around their wide-open eyes, creating an appearance some find disturbing, perhaps explaining their many appearances in horror, sci-fi, and comedy media. They can also symbolize emptiness and mindlessness.

In popular culture
The Jolly Chimp has appeared in the opening scene of Rebel Without a Cause in 1955, the 1977 Steven Spielberg film Close Encounters of the Third Kind, the 1988 horror film Monkey Shines, the 1996 film Merlin's Shop of Mystical Wonders, the 2000 film How the Grinch Stole Christmas (2000 film), the 2004 film Eurotrip, the 2007 film The Simpsons Movie, the 2010 Disney/Pixar animated film Toy Story 3 and the 2019 horror film Annabelle Comes Home. 

It is also widely seen in the games Fallout 4 and Fallout 76, and features in horror writer Stephen King'''s 1980 story The Monkey. 

One also appears in the Wallace and Gromit 2008 short A Matter of Loaf and Death. A monkey with a bomb attached to its back features prominently in the Call of Duty franchise’s “Zombies” gamemode.

The 2006 Hot Chip song Over and Over references "a monkey with a miniature cymbal".

Large Jolly chimps are seen in the 2018 horror platformer The Missing: J.J. Macfield and the Island of Memories and are used to solve many of the game's puzzles.

The character Jinx from League of Legends has a big emotional connection to Jolly Chimps. Other than explosions which give her happiness, Jolly Chimps give her peace to her mentally ill mind. This connection can be seen in her starring 2021 animated series Arcane: League of Legends.

Most recently the Chimp has featured in the popular Netflix series Stranger Things'' in 2022.

References

Monkeys in popular culture
1950s toys
Mechanical toys
Traditional toys
Toy animals
Toy Story characters
Cymbals
Toy instruments and noisemakers